Robert S. Moore  (born May 14, 1974) is a Canadian lawyer, politician, and former Minister of State (ACOA) and Regional Minister for New Brunswick and Newfoundland and Labrador.

Moore was first elected to parliament in the 2004 federal election serving until his defeat in the 2015 federal election. He was re-elected in the 2019 federal election for his former riding of Fundy Royal.

Early life and career
Moore was born in Gander, Newfoundland. He is the son of a Pentecostal minister, R. Douglas Moore (of the Pentecostal Assemblies of Canada) and his wife, Marie. He has two younger sisters and a younger brother. Due to his father's pastoral work, Moore spent time during his childhood living near Syracuse, New York and also spent eight years from late childhood to his mid-teenage years living in Boiling Springs, Pennsylvania. While in Pennsylvania, he attended Bethel Christian Academy, a school in Carlisle, Pennsylvania affiliated with his father's church, Bethel Assembly of God. After completing the 8th grade at Bethel Christian Academy (now called Carlisle Christian Academy), he briefly attended Boiling Springs High School (with the South Middleton School District) in Boiling Springs, PA. His family returned to Canada in the summer of 1989 when his father, a Canadian citizen, started a church. Moore completed his high school education at Kennebecasis Valley High School in 1992.

Moore has a Bachelor of Arts degree in Business Administration and a Bachelor of Laws degree from the University of New Brunswick.  He was admitted to the Law Society of New Brunswick in June 2000.

He and his wife Melinda live in Quispamsis with their two daughters, Madeline and Katelyn and son Robert.

Political career
Moore ran in the 2000 federal election for the Canadian Alliance in the New Brunswick riding of Fundy—Royal. He finished third, with 8,392 votes behind John Herron of the Progressive Conservative Party of Canada.

Following the 2003 merger of the Progressive Conservatives and the Canadian Alliance into the new Conservative Party of Canada, Moore ran as the Conservative candidate in the 2004 election in the reshaped riding of Fundy against Herron, who had not supported the merger and ran as the Liberal candidate in the 2004 election. Moore won the rematch.

In the 2006 election, Moore defeated three opponents: Eldon Hunter of the Liberal Party of Canada, Rob Moir of the New Democratic Party, and Patty Donovan of the Green Party of Canada. The Conservatives, led by Stephen Harper, replaced the Liberals' minority government with one of their own in 2006. When the new government was sworn in in February 2006, Moore was appointed Parliamentary Secretary to the Minister of Justice and Attorney General of Canada. Moore's duties as Parliamentary Secretary to the Minister of Justice included representing the Minister in Parliament and in the Standing Committee on Justice and Human Rights.

Harper led the Conservative minority government as Prime Minister of Canada for over two years before the 2008 Canadian federal election after which a coalition threat was narrowly defeated by a combination of delaying tactics and leadership shifts in the Liberal Party of Canada. Moore was personally re-elected.

On January 19, 2010, Harper appointed Moore to cabinet as the Minister of State (Small Business and Tourism). He replaced Diane Ablonczy, who moved to Minister of State (Seniors). He was eventually released from cabinet after the general election in May 2011 (in which the Conservatives won their first majority government since their re-formation under that name). Michael Sona, the only person charged in relation the 2011 Canadian federal election voter suppression scandal, worked for a time as a communications special assistant for Moore after the election.

On July 15, 2013, Moore was reinstated in the cabinet and named Minister of State (ACOA) and Regional Minister for New Brunswick and Newfoundland and Labrador in a cabinet shuffle. Moore ran for reelection as the Conservative candidate for Fundy Royal in the 2015 Canadian federal election but lost to Alaina Lockhart, who became only the second Liberal in a century to win what was generally a safe Conservative seat.

On September 15, 2016, Moore was appointed as the Conservative critic for the Atlantic Canada Opportunities Agency (ACOA) by Interim Leader of the Conservative Party, Rona Ambrose, replacing Scott Armstrong. He was the only Conservative Party critic who was not a member of either the Senate of Canada or the House of Commons of Canada.

Moore regained his seat of Fundy Royal, defeating Lockhart, in the 2019 Canadian federal election.

Moore endorsed Peter MacKay in the 2020 Conservative Party of Canada leadership election. He was re-elected in the 2021 federal election.

Electoral record

References

External links

1974 births
Members of the King's Privy Council for Canada
Members of the House of Commons of Canada from New Brunswick
Conservative Party of Canada MPs
People from Gander, Newfoundland and Labrador
University of New Brunswick alumni
Lawyers in New Brunswick
Living people
Members of the 28th Canadian Ministry
University of New Brunswick Faculty of Law alumni